Wright Rock is a small, steep-sided granite island, with an area of 9.36 ha, in south-eastern Australia.  It is part of Tasmania’s Bass Pyramid Group, lying in northern Bass Strait between Flinders Island and the Kent Group.  It has been a nature reserve since 5 April 1978.

Fauna
Recorded breeding seabird species include Pacific gull and silver gull.  It is also an important haul-out site for Australian fur seals, with pups being born there occasionally.

See also

 List of islands of Tasmania

References

Furneaux Group
Nature reserves in Tasmania